is a Japanese football player who plays for Giravanz Kitakyushu on loan from Shimizu S-Pulse.

Playing career
Nishimura was born in Osaka Prefecture on November 4, 1999. After graduating from high school, he joined J1 League club Shimizu S-Pulse in 2018.

Career statistics
Updated to 18 May 2019.

References

External links

1999 births
Living people
Association football people from Osaka Prefecture
Japanese footballers
J1 League players
J2 League players
J3 League players
Shimizu S-Pulse players
Fagiano Okayama players
Giravanz Kitakyushu players
Association football midfielders